Perrino is an Italian surname. Notable people with the surname include:

Giuseppe Perrino (1992–2021), Italian footballer
Joseph Perrino (born 1982), American actor
Robert Perrino (1938–1992), American mobster

See also
Parrino
Perino

Italian-language surnames